Raudsand or Rausand is a village in Molde Municipality in Møre og Romsdal county, Norway.

References

Villages in Møre og Romsdal
Molde